The  is a rapid transit electric multiple unit (EMU) train type operated by Osaka Municipal Subway on the Nagahori Tsurumi-ryokuchi Line in Japan.

The 70 series was among the earliest trains in Japan to use linear motors, and is capable of driverless operation.

Refurbishment 
The 1st batch of 70 series trains (sets 01-13) is scheduled to undergo major refurbishment, with set 13 the first refurbished set to re-enter service on March 4, 2011. The refurbishment will include the fitting of new linear motor traction systems, a new 3-colour LED display system above passenger doors, new LCD passenger information monitors, lower hand grips, a yellow line printed on passenger doors and new train car number indicators on the exterior similar to those seen on the 30000 series and the refurbished 25 series trains.

See also 
 List of driverless trains

Electric multiple units of Japan
00070
00070
Train-related introductions in 1990
Kawasaki multiple units
Kinki Sharyo multiple units
Nippon Sharyo multiple units
1500 V DC multiple units of Japan